Edward Field (born June 7, 1924) is an American poet and author.

Biography
Field was born in Brooklyn, New York City, to a family of Ashkenazi immigrants. He grew up in Lynbrook, Long Island, New York, and, being Jewish, he and his family faced antisemitism and discrimination. He played cello in the Field Family Trio, which had a weekly radio program on WGBB Freeport. He served in World War II in the 8th Air Force in England and France, as a navigator in heavy bombers, and flew 25 missions over Germany. In February 1945 he took part in a raid on Berlin with his B-17. His bomber was crippled by flak and crash-landed in the North Sea. All ten crew members made it into the plane’s life rafts, but only seven of them managed to resist till the moment they were rescued by a British air-sea boat hours later.

He began writing poetry during World War II, after a Red Cross worker handed him an anthology of poetry.  In 1963 his book Stand Up, Friend, With Me was awarded the prestigious Lamont Poetry Prize and was published.  In 1992, he received a Lambda Award for Counting Myself Lucky, Selected Poems 1963–1992.

Other honors include the Shelley Memorial Award, a Rome Prize, and an Academy Award for the documentary film To Be Alive, for which he wrote the narration. He received the Bill Whitehead Award for Lifetime Achievement from Publishing Triangle in 2005.

In 1979, he edited the anthology A Geography of Poets, and in 1992, with Gerald Locklin and Charles Stetler, brought out a sequel, A New Geography of Poets.

He and his partner Neil Derrick (1931–2018), long-time residents of Greenwich Village, wrote a best-selling historical novel about the Village, The Villagers. They were both artists in residence at Westbeth Artists Community since 1972. Derrick died on January 5, 2018. As of 2018, Field continued to reside at Westbeth. 
Field's narrative poem "World War II" is part of "Poets of World War II" anthology, published by the Library of America and edited by Harvey Shapiro.

In 2005 the University of Wisconsin Press published his literary memoirs The Man Who Would Marry Susan Sontag and Other Intimate Literary Portraits of the Bohemian Era, the title of which refers to the writer Alfred Chester.  His most recent book After the Fall: Poems Old and New was published by the University of Pittsburgh Press in 2007.

British editor Diana Athill's Instead of a Book: Letters to a Friend (Granta Books, 2011) is a collection of letters from her to Field chronicling their intimate correspondence spanning more than 30 years.

In 2019, Field's niece Diane Weishe produced the animated film "Minor Accident of War", inspired by his memories of survival during the World War II.  Designed by Piotr Kabat, the film is narrated by Field.

Books

Poetry
 Icarus (1963)
 Stand Up, Friend, With Me (Grove Press, 1963)
 Variety Photoplays (Grove Press, 1967)
 Eskimo Songs and Stories (Delacorte Press, 1973)
 A Full Heart (Sheep Meadow Press, 1977)
 Stars in My Eyes (Sheep Meadow Press, 1978)
 The Lost, Dancing (Watershed Tapes, 1984)
 New And Selected Poems (Sheep Meadow Press, 1987)
 Counting Myself Lucky, Selected Poems 1963–1992 (Black Sparrow, 1992)
 A Frieze for a Temple of Love (Black Sparrow Books, 1998)
 Magic Words (Harcourt Brace, 1998)
 After The Fall: Poems Old and New (University of Pittsburgh Press, 2007)

Fiction (with Neil Derrick)
 The Potency Clinic (Bleecker Street Press, 1978)
 Die PotenzKlinik (Berlin: Albino Verlag, 1982)
 Village (Avon Books, 1982)
 The Office (Ballantine Books, 1987)
 The Villagers (Painted Leaf Press, 2000)

Non-fiction
 The Man Who Would Marry Susan Sontag, and Other Intimate Literary Portraits of the Bohemian Era (University of Wisconsin Press, 2006, paperback edition, 2007)
  Kabuli Days: Travels in Old Afghanistan (World Parade Books, 2008)
  Voyage to Destruction: The Moroccan Letters of Alfred Chester (Spuyten Duyvil, 2022)

Anthologies and editorial
 A Geography of Poets (Bantam Books, 1979)
 (with C. Stetler/G. Locklin) A New Geography of Poets (University of Arkansas Press, 1992)
 Editor, Head of a Sad Angel, Stories by Alfred Chester (Black Sparrow, 1990). Introduction by Gore Vidal.
 Editor, Looking For Genet, Essays by Alfred Chester (Black Sparrow Press, 1992)
 Editor, Dancing with a Tiger, Selected Poems by Robert Friend (Spuyten Duyvil, 2003)

Periodicals
Poetry and essays in The New Yorker, New York Review of Books, Gay & Lesbian Review, Partisan Review, The Nation, Evergreen Review, New York Times Book Review, Michigan Quarterly, Raritan Quarterly Review, Parnassus, and Kenyon Review.

Miscellaneous
 Wrote narration for documentary film To Be Alive, which won Academy Award, 1965
 Readings at the Library of Congress, Poetry Center, YMHA, and hundreds of colleges and universities
 Taught poetry workshops at the Poetry Center, YMHA, Sarah Lawrence, Hofstra U.
 Editor of The Alfred Chester Society Newsletter

Awards and honors
 Lamont Poetry Prize (Academy of American Poets), 1962
 Guggenheim Fellowship, 1963
 Shelley Memorial Award (Poetry Society of America), 1974
 Prix de Rome (American Academy of Arts & Letters), 1981
 Lambda Literary Award, 1993
 Bill Whitehead Lifetime Achievement Award (Publishing Triangle), 2005
 W. H. Auden Award (Sheep Meadow Foundation), 2005

References

External links
 Field's website
 Benjamin Ivry, "British Literary Doyenne's Letters to Gay Poet" , The Forward , March 9, 2012
 Interview with Edward Field, September 2016
Edward Field papers held by Special Collections, University of Delaware Library
Edward Field Alfred Chester archives at Special Collections, University of Delaware Library

1924 births
American male poets
Living people
American gay writers
Lambda Literary Award for Gay Poetry winners
American LGBT poets
Writers from Brooklyn
People from Lynbrook, New York
LGBT Jews
Jewish American poets
20th-century American poets
21st-century American poets
American LGBT military personnel
Gay military personnel
United States Army Air Forces personnel of World War II
United States Army Air Forces officers
Shot-down aviators
20th-century American male writers
21st-century American male writers
Gay poets